The Population and Housing Census of Malaysia, 2010, was conducted by Department of Statistics from 6 July to 22 August 2010. It was carried out in three phases; the first phase from 6 to 21 July, the second phase from 22 July to 6 August, and the third phase from 6 to 22 August. To ensure a complete coverage, mapping-out activities were undertaken at the end of each phase. All persons living in private living quarters, collective living quarters such as college or university hostels, charitable or social welfare institutions, prisons, and shelters for homeless persons; were enumerated based on their usual place of residence in Malaysia on the Census Day that is 6 July 2010.

See also 
 Census in Malaysia

External links 
 Population and Housing Census of Malaysia, 2010

2010
Census
2010 census
Malaysia